Quadrant Peak is a peak (430 m) forming the summit of Vindication Island, South Sandwich Islands. The peak forms a narrow ridge above the uniform slopes of the original volcanic cone, and is a quadrant of what was probably once a circular mass cone. The peak was named by the United Kingdom Antarctic Place-Names Committee (UK-APC) in 1971.

Volcanoes of the Atlantic Ocean
Volcanoes of South Georgia and the South Sandwich Islands
Mountains and hills of South Georgia and the South Sandwich Islands